Joan Brull i Vinyoles (25 January 1863, Barcelona - 3 February 1912, Barcelona) was a Catalan painter active in the late 19th century. He was a Catalan symbolist painter, along with other artists including Adrià Gual, Josep Maria Tamburini, and Alexandre de Riquer.

Biography 
Brull was born in Barcelona, Spain.  He studied at the Escola de la Llotja and in Paris. He later worked as an art critic for the magazine Joventut.  He participated in a variety of intellectual groups of the era, including the Els Quatre Gats and the Real Círculo Artístico de Barcelona. He was also friends with Ramon Casas and Santiago Rusiñol. In 1896, he won first place in the International Exposition of Barcelona with his work Ensomni.

In 2009, the Caixa Foundation Girona put on a retrospective exhibition in its Fontana d'Or Center, which featured over 40 works by Brull. Two other solo exhibitions were dedicated to him: in 1924 and in 1959.

Brull's early work is realistic, but later in his career he focused on symbolism, including representations of (typically female) mythological characters. He is also known for his many portraits, the majority of which were of children and beggars in Barcelona in the later 19th century.

Representative works 
 La tonsura del rei Wamba
 Ensomni
 Sueño, currently in the Museu Nacional d'Art de Catalunya (MNAC)
 Retrato de Niña, currently in the Biblioteca Museo Víctor Balaguer

References

Other sources 
 Guia del Museu Nacional d'Art de Catalunya. Editat pel MNAC, 2004.

External links
 

1863 births
1912 deaths
Symbolist painters
Painters from Catalonia
19th-century Spanish painters
19th-century Spanish male artists
Spanish male painters
20th-century Spanish painters
20th-century Spanish male artists